Earth, Sky, and Everything in Between is a compilation by Canadian band I Mother Earth. It features four rare tracks and a live studio session recorded in 1997 for a Sound Source Radio Special at Mushroom Studios, Vancouver.

Personnel
Edwin – vocals
Jagori Tanna – guitars, backing vocals
Bruce Gordon – bass
Christian Tanna – drums

Track listing
All songs written by "I Mother Earth"

 Levitate (Acoustic) – 4:34
 So Gently We Go (Acoustic) – 5:07
 Subterranean Wonderland – 8:05
 Wrong – 5:35
 Like a Girl – 4:55
 Used to be Alright – 5:30
 Pisser – 5:30
 Another Sunday – 4:42
 One More Astronaut – 6:10
 Por Todos (Percussion Intro) – 2:25
 Earth, Sky & C – 7:04
 Levitate – 5:36

Tracks 1 to 3 are b-sides to the Dig album, track 4 is a b-side to the Scenery and Fish album, tracks 5 to 12 are 1997 live studio sessions.

References

2001 albums
I Mother Earth albums